Vivo is a 2021 American computer-animated musical comedy film produced by Columbia Pictures and Sony Pictures Animation. The film was directed by Kirk DeMicco and co-directed by Brandon Jeffords, from a screenplay written by DeMicco and Quiara Alegría Hudes, based on an original idea by Hudes and Peter Barsocchini; with songs written by Lin-Manuel Miranda, who also voices the title character and serves as one of the executive producers of the film. The cast also features the voices of Zoe Saldana, Juan de Marcos, Brian Tyree Henry, Michael Rooker, Nicole Byer, Gloria Estefan, and introducing Ynairaly Simo in her film debut as Gabi. The film marks Sony Pictures Animation's first musical film. The story follows Vivo (Miranda), a music-loving kinkajou, who embarks on the journey of a lifetime to fulfill his destiny and must deliver a love song to Marta Sandoval (Estefan), a retiring singer.

The film was first pitched to DreamWorks Animation in 2010 by Miranda following the success of his stage musical In the Heights but was canceled due to the restructuring at the company in 2015. It was later revived and fast-tracked by Sony Pictures Animation on December 14, 2016, with DeMicco directing, Stewart producing, Mark executive-producing, and Alegría Hudes writing the screenplay from a story by Barsocchini. Cast members for the film were announced in April 2021. Apart from Miranda's original songs, his longtime collaborator and musical director Alex Lacamoire composed the film's score. 

Vivo was released in select theatres on July 30, 2021, and digitally on Netflix on August 6, 2021. The film received generally positive reviews from critics, who praised the animation, voice performances, and musical numbers.

Plot

In Havana, Cuba, Andrés Hernández and his kinkajou Vivo play music together in the plaza. One day after their show, Andrés receives a letter from his old friend, Marta Sandoval, informing him that she is retiring from her music career. The letter offers a chance to reconnect in Miami, at the Mambo Cabana and for Andrés to finally tell Marta he loves her through a song he wrote just for her. Vivo, happy with their life in Cuba, is reluctant to help Andrés. The next morning, Andrés dies in his sleep and that night, a funeral service is held in the plaza, with Andrés' niece-in-law Rosa and her daughter Gabi attending before they head back to their home in Key West, Florida.

Ashamed of his earlier reluctance, Vivo vows himself to get Marta to hear Andrés' song. He stows away to Key West with Gabi and Rosa in their luggage. Gabi finds Vivo and agrees to help him deliver Andrés' song to Marta. Under the guise of attending a cookie sale in town, Gabi and Vivo purchase bus tickets to get to Marta's show, but they are stopped by the Sand Dollars, a girl scout troop who show an interest in Vivo. Gabi and Vivo escape from them, but miss the bus. They end up in the Everglades and are separated by a heavy rain storm, losing the song.

While searching for Gabi, Vivo comes across a roseate spoonbill named Dancarino, who is unsuccessful in finding love with one of his own. With Vivo's help, he is able to win the heart of Valentina. The two later rescue Vivo from a Burmese python named Lutador. Meanwhile, Gabi discovers that she was followed by the Sand Dollars on a boat and that they have Andrés' song, keeping it from her until she leads them to Vivo. When the girls are attacked by Lutador, Vivo saves them, but the song is destroyed in the process. Devastated, Vivo considers returning to Cuba until he realizes he and Gabi can recreate the song, as he knows the melody and Gabi knows the lyrics. Together, they make it to Miami and search for Marta, who has learned of Andrés' death and refuses to go on stage.

Gabi and Vivo sneak inside the Mambo Cabana, but Gabi is unable to enter and tells Vivo to go on without her. She is soon caught by security and her furious mother. Vivo finds a mourning Marta, who recognizes him from Andrés' obituary photo, and delivers the song. Touched by the song, Marta is revitalized and decides to go on stage. Vivo then locates Gabi and Rosa, who are arguing while driving back home. Gabi confesses she decided to help Vivo because she misses her deceased father. Deeply moved, Rosa reassures her daughter, and drives Gabi and Vivo back to the concert just in time to hear Marta play Andrés' song. Vivo decides to stay in Florida with Gabi and Rosa. Gabi and Vivo put on their own show in the city with Marta, entertaining the crowd.

Voice cast
 Lin-Manuel Miranda as Vivo, a singer-musician kinkajou
 Zoe Saldana as Rosa, Gabi's mother and Andrés' niece-in-law
 Juan de Marcos González as Andrés, Vivo's late owner and Gabi's grand-uncle
 González reprises his role in the Spanish dub of the film
 Brian Tyree Henry and Nicole Byer as Dancarino and Valentina, a pair of star-crossed roseate spoonbills
 Aneesa Folds provides Valentina's singing voice
 Michael Rooker as Lutador, a villainous Burmese python who dislikes any noise
 Ynairaly Simo as Gabi, Andrés' great-niece, an energetic, but eccentric and misunderstood 10-year-old with a gift of gab and rapping
 Gloria Estefan as Marta Sandoval, Andrés' old partner and unrequited love, who is now a legendary singer performing in the United States
 Katie Lowes, Olivia Trujillo, and Lidya Jewett as Becky, Eva, and Sarah; the Sand Dollars, a trio of well-meaning but overzealous girl scout troopers
 Bri Holland, Alana de Fonseca, and Jada Banks-Mace provide their singing voices
 Christian Ochoa as Montoya, Andrés's friend
 Brandon Jeffords as Mr. Henshaw, a Sand Dollars customer
 Gloria Calderón Kellett as Gloria, Marta's stage manager
 Leslie David Baker as Bob, a Florida bus driver

Production

Development
The film's origins trace back to 2010, when DreamWorks Animation approached Lin-Manuel Miranda about the pitch of the film following the success of his stage musical In the Heights. Due to a restructuring in 2015, DreamWorks eventually dropped the project. On December 14, 2016, Sony Pictures Animation acquired the project from DreamWorks and fast-tracked it under the name Vivo, which was based on an original idea by Peter Barsocchini, with Kirk DeMicco directing, Lisa Stewart producing, Laurence Mark executive-producing, and Quiara Alegría Hudes writing the screenplay from a story by Barsocchini. On June 12, 2019, Kristine Belson announced at the 2019 Annecy International Animated Film Festival that Rich Moore would join the film as co-producer of the film with Roger Deakins serving as the film's visual consultant. The 2D animation was handled by James Baxter while the main animation is handled by Sony Pictures Imageworks. The cast was announced on April 26, 2021.

Music
On December 14, 2016, it was revealed that Miranda would be writing 11 songs for the film. On April 26, 2021, it was reported that Miranda's recurring collaborator Alex Lacamoire worked on the film as both its score composer and executive music producer. The film's soundtrack features "My Own Drum (Remix)", performed by Ynairaly Simo and Missy Elliott. The score was recorded at Synchron Stage Vienna.

All songs are written by Lin-Manuel Miranda. All scores are composed by Alex Lacamoire.

Release
On December 14, 2016, the film was scheduled to be theatrically released on December 18, 2020. On January 26, 2018, the film's theatrical release date was moved a month earlier, to November 6, 2020. On November 1, 2019, the film's theatrical release date was moved to April 16, 2021, only to be delayed to June 4, 2021, as a result of the COVID-19 pandemic. On April 26, 2021, Sony announced the cancellation of the film's theatrical release and licensed the film rights to Netflix, with Sony retaining home entertainment, linear TV, and Chinese distribution rights. The film was released in select theatres on July 30, 2021, and on Netflix on August 6, 2021.

Home media
Vivo was released on Blu-ray, DVD, and Digital HD on August 9, 2022 by Sony Pictures Home Entertainment.

Reception

Streaming viewership
Vivo was the highest viewed film on Netflix in the month of August, with 493 million minutes in its first full week, translating to roughly 5.7 million viewings for the week of August 2 to August 9. Netflix announced in its Q3 2021 earnings call that 46 million accounts had sampled the movie.

Critical response
On Rotten Tomatoes, 86% of 104 critics have given the film a positive review with an average score of 6.8/10. The films critical consensus reads: "Vivo offers few surprises, but this attractively animated adventure is enlivened by the catchy songs contributed by star Lin-Manuel Miranda." On Metacritic, the film has a weighted average score of 66 out of 100, based on 22 critics, indicating "generally favorable reviews".

Maya Phillips of The New York Times praised Miranda's singing and said "Miranda's songs incorporate his signature rapid-fire rapping, along with quick tempo changes and genre mash-ups. Gabi's song, “My Own Drum,” with its grade-school Nicki Minaj-esque rap and auto-tune, is the jam I didn't know I needed in my life. “Vivo” has cuteness to spare, even if the rest is hit or miss. But, we all know, the beat goes on." Brian Lowry of CNN also concurred with Phillips and said "Lin-Manuel Miranda brings his stage-honed chops to another animated movie in ""Vivo," a sweet if slight love story built around an inordinately resourceful kinkajou. Premiering on Netflix, Miranda's songs elevate a small-boned effort—call it cute, without that being pejorative—with an unabashedly romantic streak." Benjamin Lee of The Guardian rated the film 3 stars out of 5 and wrote "But while Vivo shares the expensive sheen and general good nature of Sony's last hand-me-down, it falls short on just about everything else, a sweet and colourful musical adventure that isn't quite sweet and colourful enough, coasting on simple pleasures that fade as soon as the music stops."

Petrana Radulovic of Polygon was more critical about the film, and said in her review that while the music was "definitely one of the film's highlights," the musical deviations in the film makes it feel "like an animated version of a Hamilton outtake." She went on to praise the animation and visual style of the film, stating it "all meshes together in a beautiful symphony," but criticized the story. David Ehrlich of IndieWire gave the film a C grade and wrote "It's a fun premise for a great adventure, and a valuable lesson for kids who are liable to get blindsided by the realization that “now” is not “forever.” The only problem is that “Vivo” grows increasingly generic and forgettable as the film goes on, and the closer its furry hero gets to finding a silver lining, the more viewers wish that he never went looking for one at all." Peter Debruge of Variety also gave the film a somewhat positive review, saying "the film boasts the rich, professional look of first-rate computer animation, even if “Vivo” plays by a more conventional stylebook than the studio's [Sony Pictures Animations] recent breakthroughs “The Mitchells vs. the Machines” and “Spider-Man: Into the Spider-Verse.” The character designs are fine, if not especially inspired."

Accolades

References

External links

2021 films
2021 computer-animated films
2020s American animated films
2020s children's animated films
2020s English-language films
2020s musical comedy films
American children's animated comedy films
American children's animated musical films
American computer-animated films
Animated films about animals
Animated musical films
Columbia Pictures films
Columbia Pictures animated films
English-language Netflix original films
Films postponed due to the COVID-19 pandemic
Animated films set in Florida
Films set in Havana
Films set in Miami
Sony Pictures Animation films